Allegheny County Airport  is in West Mifflin, Pennsylvania, 7 miles (11 km) southeast of Pittsburgh. It is the fifth-busiest airport in Pennsylvania following Philadelphia, Pittsburgh, Allentown, and Harrisburg. The airport is owned by the Allegheny County Airport Authority and is the primary FAA-designated reliever airport for Pittsburgh International Airport. Allegheny County Airport was dedicated on September 11, 1931. 

When it was completed, it was third-largest airport in the country and the only hard-surface airport in the country. It was historically the main entrance to metro Pittsburgh via air from its inception until June 1952, when the Greater Pittsburgh Airport (now Pittsburgh International Airport – KPIT) opened for commercial aviation. Like many historic municipal fields, Allegheny serves small and mid-sized private, corporate and commercial traffic well, but was not built to handle jet airliners. A Boeing 727 owned by Rockwell and two DC-9's however were based on the field for years. One DC-9, owned by Westinghouse Air Brake, operated from the former TWA hangar. Another DC-9 was owned by Richard Scaife. Additionally, political candidates often operate chartered jet airliners into the field. Air Force 2, a Boeing 757, has been on the airport in the 2000s. In May 2017, a Southwest Boeing 737 with 143 passengers en route from Orlando, made a precautionary landing when running low on fuel.

The airport is popular among business travelers, being closer to downtown than Pittsburgh International Airport. It is much closer to the densely populated South Hills, Monroeville area and Monongahela Valley.

The airport had a Hollywood big screen moment in the 2002 film The Mothman Prophecies, serving as the small Point Pleasant, West Virginia airport where the governor and Richard Gere debate how serious the impending crisis is in the river town. Also the Airport and Terminal were used in the 1986 movie Gung Ho starring Michael Keaton, The 2017 film Last Flag Flying was filmed in the hangar and ramp areas.

The airport is home to Pittsburgh Institute of Aeronautics (PIA), a large aircraft maintenance school.

Facilities
The main terminal was built on a former steel industry slag dump in 1931 by Stanley L. Roush, with later additions by Henry Hornbostel in 1936. Aiming for a more modern design, the building used white brick with touches of black, silver, and green. Hornbostel continued with these colors for his additions. Above the stainless-steel canopy is a semi-hexagonal doorhead. To each side is an Art Deco urn with medallions containing images of flight by both humans and animals. The 1936 renovations bricked up all windows of the field to the restaurant and by summer 1936 it had long been known for the largest amount of runway paving in the world at a combined 50 miles, as well as being one of the largest fields in the world at 108 acres. It no longer has airlines, but can accommodate aircraft up to a DC-9.

As of March 2021 extensive renovations of the terminal building are continuing. Exterior brick restoration has been completed, and a new ceramic floor has replaced vinyl tile and very modern new and relocated restrooms have been installed, along with a restored upper lobby with new lighting fixtures and artwork. The lobby floor and restrooms continue the Art Deco Zig-Zag inspiration in the use of glazed black and white ceramic tile. At present the west wing ceiling, former restaurant site, has been restored to its original ceiling height, and the entire west side of the building is being renovated for a banquet facility. The lower level once housed the Capital Airlines office. The hair salon in the former TWA ticket office, will remain.

 10/28: 6,501 x 150 ft (1,982 x 46 m) Concrete
 13/31: 3,825 x 100 ft (1,166 x 30 m) Concrete
 Helipad H1: 47 x 45 ft (14 x 14 m) Concrete

Runway 5/23, at 2550'x 100 was closed some years ago due to the FAA policy of not funding runways that short and needed expansion for Voyager Jet Center. The Rwy 5 VOR approach was decommissioned at that time.

County Police station
The airport has a small station operated by the Allegheny County Police Department as a local station and a base for airport security operations. The airport offices and flight schools are patrolled by private security companies who work closely with the County Police.

Security
The airport does not have a defined airport security checkpoint as most flights are private planes or company jets. Airlines provide their own security inspection, if any. The way the airport building is laid out would make a checkpoint impractical and hard to control.

Crash Fire Rescue
An ARFF (Airport Rescue and Fire Fighting) station, adjacent to the former gate 1, is manned 24hrs a day by professional airport firefighters. It had been closed in a cost-saving move and responsibilities taken over by the local volunteer fire department. However, it was reopened after a single engine plane with a fire landed and the pilot later succumbed to his burns.

STAT MedEvac 
Allegheny County Airport is home to the STAT MedEvac headquarters. Based on the East end of the airfield at the former Gate 9, the building is a former FPO with adjoining maintenance hangar. Their helicopters land on the ramp dubbed "STAT Land" to reposition from other hospitals, and to re-fuel.

Recent Improvements
A series of T-hangars were erected by the airport authority, in place of deteriorated ones. The terminal has been made ADA compliant with the addition of an elevator and other modifications. The entry road and parking lot concrete has been completely replaced, along with new lighting. Extensive masonry renovation to the terminal building is currently on-going.

Future improvements
The Allegheny County Airport Authority has received $2 million from the federal stimulus bill for construction at the Allegheny County Airport.  The money will be used to renovate four taxiways.  It will also be used to reconfigure aircraft apron areas.  This will allow for future construction on aircraft maintenance hangars and ramp space associated for the maintenance areas.  Construction was scheduled to begin July 20, 2009.  The airport expected 40 new jobs to be created with the project but says it is the gateway for more jobs when the aircraft maintenance facility construction starts.  The construction will help improve the layout of the airfield.

The Mon-Fayette Expressway, now under construction from near Pittsburgh International Airport to SR51 South and SR 43 will also connect with I376 to the east with an interchange about a mile from AGC. This should be a great stimulus to the airport.

FBO Airlines
Corporate Air LLC.
Voyager Jet Center

In addition to these Fixed Base Operator (FBO) Airlines, the Allegheny County Airport offers daily scheduled charter flights to Westchester Airport serving New York City and on to Nantucket operated by Fly Louie https://www.flylouie.com/.

Aviation schools and Clubs
Pittsburgh Flight Training Center
Pittsburgh Institute of Aeronautics
ABC Flying Club, East Ramp hangar, founded 1948.

Rental car
Hertz Rental Cars
Thrifty Car Rental*

Incidents

Historic Landmark status
In 1981, the Pittsburgh History and Landmarks Foundation added the Allegheny County Airport to their List of Historic Landmarks.

Notable visitors
Harold Gatty and Wiley Post visited the airport as it was finishing construction both from the ground and air and commented that it was the finest airport they had encountered.

See also

 History of aviation in Pittsburgh

References

External links

Allegheny County Airport
Pennsylvania Bureau of Aviation: Allegheny County Airport

1931 establishments in Pennsylvania
Airports established in 1931
County airports in Pennsylvania
Pittsburgh History & Landmarks Foundation Historic Landmarks
Transportation buildings and structures in Allegheny County, Pennsylvania